Tom Clancy's Power Plays is a novel series created by authors Tom Clancy and Martin Greenberg. Each entry in the series is written by Jerome Preisler.

Novel series

 
Book series introduced in 1997
Novel series
Techno-thriller novels
Video game franchises